"Getaway Car" is a song recorded by American singer-songwriter Taylor Swift for her sixth studio album, Reputation (2017). It served as a single in Australia and New Zealand on September 7, 2018, to support the Australian shows of Swift's Reputation Stadium Tour (2018). Written and produced by Swift and Jack Antonoff, it is a synth-pop song with pulsing synthesizers, programmed drums, and distorted vocals. Lyrically, the song describes Swift's efforts to exit a relationship using romance with someone else, knowing the new relationship will also end briefly because its purpose was only to "get away" from the first one.

Contemporary critics lauded the song's production and intricate lyrics filled with imagery and references to popular culture staples, including the Bonnie and Clyde criminal couple. Some critics identified the track as a highlight of Reputation. "Getaway Car" received a platinum certification from the Australian Recording Industry Association (ARIA) and a silver certification from the British Phonographic Industry (BPI).

Writing and composition

"Getaway Car" was written and produced by Taylor Swift and Jack Antonoff. It was recorded by Swift for her sixth studio album, Reputation (2017). The song was engineered by Laura Sisk at Rough Customer Studio (Brooklyn Heights). It was mixed by Serban Ghenea at Mixstar Studios (Virginia Beach, Virginia) and mastered by Randy Merrill at Sterling Sound Studios (New York). "Getaway Car" is a synth-pop song that critics—including Rob Sheffield of Rolling Stone—felt reminiscent of the production of Swift's 2014 studio album 1989. Pitchfork Jamieson Cox said that the song specifically resembles "Out of the Woods", a song on 1989 that was also produced by Swift and Antonoff. The song features pulsing synthesizers, programmed drums, and manipulated vocals. The beginning of the song uses a vocoder for Swift's vocals. The song's lyrics are about Swift's efforts to run away from a relationship to be with someone else, only to realize that this new relationship will also end.

In the first verse, she admits: "The ties were black, the lies were white / In shades of gray in candlelight / I wanted to leave him, I needed a reason." The production builds up for the refrain, in which Swift reflects on her treachery: "Should've known I'd be the first to leave / Think about the place where you first met me / Nothing good starts in a getaway car." The lyrics, "He was running after us / I was screaming 'Go, go, go!' / But with three of us, honey, it's a sideshow," implies a love triangle that stems from Swift's affairs. She ponders on how she had left her lover abruptly: "I'm in a getaway car / I left you in a motel bar / Put the money in the bag and I stole the keys / That was the last time you ever saw me." Swift recalls that the couple were "jet-set, Bonnie and Clyde," until she abandons him for a new man, referencing the criminal couple Bonnie and Clyde. Uppy Chatterjee from the Australian magazine The Music also pointed out the song's references to rock band Bon Jovi's song "You Give Love a Bad Name" (1986). NME Hannah Mylrea also noticed references to writer Charles Dickens and the epic war film The Great Escape (1963).

Critical reception
"Getaway Car" received unanimous critical acclaim. Zack Schonfeld of Newsweek called the song as an "excellent, radiant song" and claimed that the hook is "massive, in both catchiness and energy". In a review of Reputation, Louis Bruton from The Irish Times praised "Getaway Car" for showcasing "clever and insightful songwriting, finding tenderness and beauty in tiny details". Consequence of Sound was not impressed with the album's production, but considered "Getaway Car" one of its strongest moments, writing: "the song's hook hits but doesn't punish". Eleanor Graham from The Line of Best Fit, Sarah Murphy from Exclaim! and John Murphy from musicOMH similarly lauded the track as one of Reputation strongest moments, highliting the song's intriguing lyrics.

The Atlantic Spencer Kornharber described "Getaway Car" as Reputation "savior: the one true tune to hum misty-eyed after the movies". Stephen Thomas Erlewine of AllMusic lauded the song as a high mark on the "monochromatic production" of Reputation for combining "vulnerability, melody, and confidence, but they are deeply felt and complex", which signified Swift's maturity as a singer-songwriter. Retrospectively, Rob Sheffield of Rolling Stone compared Swift's songwriting on "Getaway Car" to Paul McCartney because of "the way she goes overboard with her latest enthusiasm and starts Tay-splaining it as her personal discovery", and lauded the cinematic quality of the lyrics.

Release and chart performance
On September 7, 2018, Universal Music Australia announced that "Getaway Car" would serve as a single exclusively in Australia and New Zealand. The song was released to Australian and New Zealand contemporary hit radio stations by Universal and Big Machine Records. This release was a means of support for the then-upcoming Australian shows of Swift's Reputation Stadium Tour (2018), which she launched in support of the album Reputation. "Getaway Car" was included on the regular set list of the Reputation Stadium Tour, as part of the encore.

"Getaway Car" did not chart on the official singles chart of Australia and New Zealand. It peaked at number 26 on the Australian Digital Tracks, a songs chart based on digital sales, and number six on the TMN Hot 100, an airplay-focused chart powered by Australian magazine The Music Network. The song was certified platinum by the Australian Recording Industry Association (ARIA) for exeeding 70,000 units. In New Zealand, it peaked at number nine on the New Zealand Hot Singles, a chart compiled by the Recorded Music NZ.

Credits and personnel
Credits are adapted from the booklet of Reputation.
 Taylor Swift – vocals, songwriter, producer
 Jack Antonoff – producer, songwriter, programming, instruments, background vocals
 Laura Sisk – audio engineering
 Serban Ghenea – mixing
 John Hanes – mix engineer
 Randy Merrill – mastering
 John Hutchinson – drums
 Victoria Parker – violins
 Phillip A. Peterson – cellos

Charts

Certifications

Release history

References

2017 songs
2018 singles
American synth-pop songs
Taylor Swift songs
Torch songs
Songs written by Taylor Swift
Songs written by Jack Antonoff
Song recordings produced by Jack Antonoff
Song recordings produced by Taylor Swift